Duval County is a county located in the U.S. state of Texas. As of the 2020 census, its population was 9,831. The county seat is San Diego. The county was founded in 1858 and later organized in 1876. It is named for Burr H. Duval, a soldier in the Texas Revolution who died in the Goliad Massacre.

History
Duval County's development began during the Viceroyalty of New Spain (1521–1821). In 1804, six years before Father Miguel Hidalgo y Costilla launched Mexico's successful independence movement from Spain, Jose Faustino Contreras, surveyor general of San Luis Potosi, charted the county's landscape, which attracted colonists from Mier, Tamaulipas.

On February 1, 1858, the Texas Legislature established Duval County.  The Texas Almanac of 1867 reported that Duval and nearby Dimmit County had only four stock raisers and their population was unlikely to grow much, absent the discovery of mineral wealth.  Not long after, a wave of Anglo immigrants entered the county to raise sheep.  Englishmen, Frenchmen, Germans, Irishmen, and Scots came.  During this boom, the county seat enjoyed formal balls and haute cuisine.  The Hotel Martinet's Sunday feast drew patrons from Corpus Christi,  to the East.  

The death rate rivaled Tombstone, Arizona's. Although some died under the code duello, most of Duval County's deaths were murders that primarily victimized the legacy Spanish-speaking population.  When a great pile of cowhides presumed to have come from stolen animals was discovered near the county line, a vigilante group from Duval and McMullen County lynched 15 Spanish-speaking Texans there.

Prosperity in the 1880s placated Anglo animosity.  When the Texas Mexican Railway began operating in 1881, its San Diego station served as an important hub for trading hides, wool and cotton, but the boom evaporated when sheep began dying during the Winter of 1886–1887, triggering the Sheep Wars that once again primarily victimized the legacy Spanish-speaking population.

During the twentieth century, the Parr family established a political machine that dominated politics in Duval and nearby Jim Wells counties. The family was instrumental in the 1948 election of Lyndon B. Johnson to the US Senate, and influenced the outcome of the 1960 presidential election which threw Texas to John F. Kennedy.

Geography

The county overlies the Piedras Pintas salt dome, scheduled for at hydrogen storage.

Major highways

  U.S. Highway 59
  Interstate 69W is currently under construction and will follow the current route of U.S. 59 in most places.
  State Highway 16
  State Highway 44
  State Highway 285
  State Highway 339
  State Highway 359
  Farm to Market Road 716
  Farm to Market Road 1329
  Farm to Market Road 2295
  Farm to Market Road 3196

Adjacent counties
 McMullen County (north)
 Live Oak County (northeast)
 Jim Wells County (east)
 Brooks County (southeast)
 Jim Hogg County (south)
 Webb County (west)
 La Salle County (northwest)

Demographics

Note: the US Census treats Hispanic/Latino as an ethnic category. This table excludes Latinos from the racial categories and assigns them to a separate category. Hispanics/Latinos can be of any race.

As of the 2010 United States census, there were 11,782 people living in the county. 87.0% were White, 0.9% Black or African American, 0.4% Native American, 0.2% Asian, 9.8% of some other race and 1.7% of two or more races. 88.5% were Hispanic or Latino (of any race).

As of the census of 2000, there were 13,120 people, 4,350 households, and 3,266 families living in the county. The population density was 7 people per square mile (3/km2). There were 5,543 housing units at an average density of 3 per square mile (1/km2).  The racial makeup of the county was 80.22% White, 0.54% Black or African American, 0.53% Native American, 0.11% Asian, 0.03% Pacific Islander, 15.46% from other races, and 3.11% from two or more races. 87.99% of the population were Hispanic or Latino of any race.

There were 4,350 households, out of which 36.80% had children under the age of 18 living with them, 53.20% were married couples living together, 16.80% had a female householder with no husband present, and 24.90% were non-families. 22.90% of all households were made up of individuals, and 11.70% had someone living alone who was 65 years of age or older. The average household size was 2.88 and the average family size was 3.40.

In the county, the population was spread out, with 29.50% under the age of 18, 9.50% from 18 to 24, 26.40% from 25 to 44, 20.60% from 45 to 64, and 14.00% who were 65 years of age or older. The median age was 34 years. For every 100 females there were 100.70 males. For every 100 females age 18 and over, there were 102.90 males.

The median income for a household in the county was $22,416, and the median income for a family was $26,014. Males had a median income of $25,601 versus $16,250 for females. The per capita income for the county was $11,324. About 23.00% of families and 27.20% of the population were below the poverty line, including 35.90% of those under age 18 and 25.30% of those age 65 or over.

Politics
Duval County is a Democratic stronghold like most of heavily Hispanic South Texas. The last Republican to carry the county was Theodore Roosevelt in 1904. In the 1964, 1968 and 1972 presidential elections, Duval was the most Democratic county in the country. In the 2004 presidential election, the county voted for Democrat John F. Kerry of Massachusetts by a strong margin despite George W. Bush's 22.87 percent margin of victory in the state. From 1956 to 2012, the Democratic candidate consistently received more than seventy percent of the county's vote. After 2012, the county's voters began to trend towards the Republican Party; the Democratic margin of victory decreased by 18.9 percentage points from 2012 to 2016, and by 32.6 percentage points from 2016 to 2020, with 2020 Democratic presidential nominee Joe Biden winning the county by only 2.6 percent, the worst-ever Democratic performance in the county.

After the initial election returns in the 1948 Democrat runoff primary election for U.S. Senate, Duval County added 425 votes for Lyndon B. Johnson over Coke R. Stevenson. (George Parr simultaneously arranged the more famous electoral fraud for Johnson in Alice, Texas.)

Duval County is notorious for corrupt politics, particularly during the early and mid-20th century, when it was largely controlled by the political machine of Texas State Senator Archie Parr and his son George Parr, each in his turn called El Patrón or the "Duke of Duval". Givens Parr had been county judge before his younger brother George.  George was later elected sheriff. Archer Parr III, George's nephew and adopted brother, later held both those offices. Meanwhile, then Texas Attorney General John Ben Shepperd brought some three hundred state indictments against county and school officials.

Communities

Cities
 Benavides
 Freer
 San Diego (county seat) (small part in Jim Wells County)

Census-designated places
 Concepcion
 Realitos

Unincorporated communities
 Ramirez
 Rios
 Sejita

Ghost towns
 Crestonio
 Pila Blanca
 Sweden

Education
School districts for the county include:
 Benavides Independent School District
 Freer Independent School District
 Premont Independent School District
 Ramirez Common School District
 San Diego Independent School District

Coastal Bend College (formerly Bee County College) is the designated community college for the county.

See also

 Recorded Texas Historic Landmarks in Duval County

References

External links
 

 
1876 establishments in Texas
Populated places established in 1876
Majority-minority counties in Texas
Hispanic and Latino American culture in Texas